Akongjamba was a nobleman of a King in Ancient Moirang in Meitei mythology and folklore.  He was a lover of the harvest Goddess Phouoibi, but fate didn't permit the lovers to unite, so they reincarnated. The lives of the two legendary lovers were believed to be enacted by Thangjing as a part of the Epic cycles of incarnations (Moirang Saiyon of the Moirang Kangleirol legends).

Legends 
Once, Goddess Phouoibi (Fouoibi) set out for a journey along with Ngaleima and Thumleima. In Moirang, when she was trying to cross a river, Akongjamba came to the place for hunting. He fell in love with Phouoibi at first sight, and they became great lovers.

Many days later, Phouoibi went to Akongjamba's house, disguising herself as a tribal woman. Akongjamba was not at home, and his mother (Akongjamba's wife in another version) didn't give her good shelter. She was about to hit Phouoibi with a broom. As a divine being could lose their powers at the touch of profane objects like brooms, Phouoibi fled to the coop of the house and transformed into a chicken. Akongjamba's mother chased her, and she counted the number of chickens. She didn't find any new chicken, so she was gone, and Phouoibi spent the night inside the dirty henhouse. The next day, she went back to her true divine maiden form in a glowing dress. She called Akongjamba's mother to come out, and gave her the payment for spending a night at her place. She shook an enormous heap of golden grain off her body. The grains fell in the middle of the courtyard of the house, and she left in the south east direction. Akongjamba's mother was surprised at this.
 
When Akongjamba returned home, he found the pile of golden grain as high as a hill in front of the courtyard. His mother narrated him the entire story, and he realised that the strange lady was Phouoibi, his ladylove. He immediately followed her path. On the way, he found her and he pleaded her to return home together, but she told him that they were not destined to unite to accomplish their work at that birth, and she then left him.

In popular culture 
 Phou-oibi, the rice goddess is a 2009 ballad opera performed by the Laihui Ensemble. It is based on the love story of Phouoibi and Akongjamba.
 Phouoibi Shayon is a 2017 Manipuri mythology movie based on the love story of Phouoibi and Akongjamba.

See also 
 Adonis

References 

Epic cycles of incarnations
Meitei mythology
Meitei folklore
Meitei literature